Brigadier James Edward Fryer "Jeff" Linton  (7 May 1909–27 December 1989) was a Welsh cricketer and British Army officer. He served with the Royal Artillery during World War II after previously playing first-class cricket for Glamorgan County Cricket Club in the 1932 English cricket season as a right-handed batsman and right-arm medium-fast bowler. He also represented the Egypt national cricket team.

Biography

Born in Llandaff in 1909, Linton was educated at Charterhouse School where he captained the cricket team. He played his only two first-class matches for his native Glamorgan in August 1932 against Middlesex and Hampshire. In April 1938 he played twice for Egypt against HM Martineau's XI.

He served with the Royal Artillery during World War II, and was awarded the Distinguished Service Order in 1944 after escaping from a prisoner-of-war camp. He had a distinguished military career, and after the war was elevated to the rank of Brigadier and became a senior instructor in anti-tank warfare at the School of Artillery. He died in Mexico in 1989.

References

External links
1st British Airborne Division officers

British Army brigadiers
Welsh military personnel
People from Llandaff
People educated at Charterhouse School
British Army personnel of World War II
Companions of the Distinguished Service Order
Egyptian cricketers
Welsh cricketers
Glamorgan cricketers
1909 births
1989 deaths
Royal Artillery officers
British World War II prisoners of war
British escapees